Lilliehöökfjorden is a 14 kilometer long fjord branch of Krossfjorden in Albert I Land at the northwestern side of Spitsbergen, Svalbard. The fjord is named after Gustaf Bertil Lilliehöök.

Lilliehöökfjorden is separated from Möllerfjorden by the 12 kilometer long mountain ridge Kong Haakons Halvøy.

The Lilliehöökbreen glacier debouches into the fjord, and calved ice may fill large parts of the fjord.

References

Fjords of Spitsbergen